Raymond Wesley Starr (August 24, 1888 – November 2, 1968) was a United States district judge of the United States District Court for the Western District of Michigan.

Education and career

Born in Harbor Springs, Michigan, Starr received a Bachelor of Laws from the University of Michigan Law School in 1910. He was in private practice in Grand Rapids, Michigan from 1910 to 1937, and was then Attorney General of Michigan from 1937 to 1938, thereafter returning to private practice until 1941. He was a justice of the Michigan Supreme Court from 1941 to 1946.

Federal judicial service

On July 3, 1946, Starr was nominated by President Harry S. Truman to a seat on the United States District Court for the Western District of Michigan vacated by Judge Fred Morton Raymond. Starr was confirmed by the United States Senate on July 23, 1946, and received his commission on July 25, 1946. He served as Chief Judge from 1954 to 1961, assuming senior status on August 15, 1961. Starr served in that capacity until his death on November 2, 1968.

References

Sources
 

1888 births
1968 deaths
University of Michigan Law School alumni
People from Harbor Springs, Michigan
Michigan Attorneys General
Justices of the Michigan Supreme Court
Judges of the United States District Court for the Western District of Michigan
United States district court judges appointed by Harry S. Truman
20th-century American judges